Joyride is the first EP by the Japanese electronica/rock duo the Boom Boom Satellites, released on November 1, 1997. The title also refers to a single of the same name with the track "Joyride" and two versions of "The Countless Past to be Hidden" or to a 12" remix with a remix by Boom Boom Satellites and another by Luke Slater.

Track listing

Personnel
Credits adapted from liner notes.
 Artwork By [Art Direction], Photography – Shinchiro Hirata (Primitive Hands)
 Drums – Naoki Hirai
 Producer, Composed By – Boom Boom Satellites
 Programmed By, Bass – Masayuki Nakano
 Vocals, Guitar – Michiyuki Kawashima

References

External links
 Boom Boom Satellites official website

Boom Boom Satellites albums
1997 EPs